Pankaj Kumar Singh (born 19 December 1962) was the 29th Director General of BSF, and an Indian Police Service officer of 1988 batch. He is the son of Ex BSF DG Prakash Singh. He has been appointed as Deputy National Security Advisor of India in Jan 2023 for a period of 2 years.

Education 
Pankaj Kumar Singh holds degrees of BSc (Hons) Physics from Hindu College, Delhi University, M.Phil. from Chennai University, LL.B Delhi University, and PG Diploma in Business Administration from IIM Ahmedabad.

Personal life
He is the son of former Director General of Border Security Force, Prakash Singh, who served as the DG of BSF from 1993 to 1994.

Awards 
He has been decorated with several DG's Discs and commendations. He also got awarded with UN Peace Medal (Bar), Police Medal for Meritorious Service and President Police Medal for Distinguished Service.

References

External links 
'BSF won’t be a parallel police force': DG Pankaj Kumar Singh
Pankaj Kumar Singh appointed new BSF DG
नियुक्ति: पंकज कुमार सिंह बने बीएसएफ के नए डीजी, संजय अरोड़ा ने संभाला आईटीबीपी का पदभार
Rajasthan केडर के वरिष्ठ IPS Pankaj Singh बने BSF के नए DG, जयपुर के महानिरीक्षक के रूप में भी किया है काम

1962 births
Living people

Indian civil servants

Indian police officers
All India Services